Alkalinity (from ) is the capacity of water to resist acidification. It should not be confused with basicity, which is an absolute measurement on the pH scale. Alkalinity is the strength of a buffer solution composed of weak acids and their conjugate bases. It is measured by titrating the solution with an acid such as HCl until its pH changes abruptly, or it reaches a known endpoint where that happens. Alkalinity is expressed in units of concentration, such as meq/L (milliequivalents per liter), μeq/kg (microequivalents per kilogram), or mg/L CaCO3 (milligrams per liter of calcium carbonate).  Each of these measurements corresponds to an amount of acid added as a titrant.

Although alkalinity is primarily a term used by limnologists and oceanographers, it is also used by hydrologists to describe temporary hardness. Moreover, measuring alkalinity is important in determining a stream's ability to neutralize acidic pollution from rainfall or wastewater. It is one of the best measures of the sensitivity of the stream to acid inputs. There can be long-term changes in the alkalinity of streams and rivers in response to human disturbances such as acid rain generated by SOx and NOx emissions.

History 
In 1884, Professor Wilhelm (William) Dittmar of Anderson College, now the University of Strathclyde, analysed 77 pristine seawater samples from around the world brought back by the Challenger expedition. He found that in seawater the major ions were in a fixed ratio, confirming the hypothesis of Johan Georg Forchhammer, that is now known as the Principle of Constant Proportions. However, there was one exception. Dittmar found that the concentration of calcium was slightly greater in the deep ocean, and named this increase alkalinity.

Also in 1884, Svante Arrhenius submitted his PhD theses in which he advocated the existence of ions in solution, and defined acids as hydronium ion donors and bases as hydroxide ion donors. For that work, he received the Nobel Prize in Chemistry in 1903. See Svante_Arrhenius#Ionic_disassociation.

Simplified summary 
Alkalinity roughly refers to the molar amount of bases in a solution that can be converted to uncharged species by a strong acid. The total charge of a solution always equal zero. This leads to a parallel definition of alkalinity that is based upon the charge balance of ions in a solution. 

By isolating the conservative ions on one side of this charge balance equation, the nonconservative ions which accept or donate protons and thus define alkalinity are clustered on the other side of the equation.

This combined charge balance and proton balance is called total alkalinity. Total alkalinity is not (much) affected by temperature, pressure, or pH, and is thus itself a conservative measurement, which increases its usefulness in aquatic systems. All anions except  and  have low concentrations in Earth's surface water (streams, rivers, and lakes).

Detailed description 
Alkalinity or measures the ability of a solution to neutralize acids to the equivalence point of carbonate or bicarbonate, defined as pH 4.5 for oceanographic/limnological studies. The alkalinity is equal to the stoichiometric sum of the bases in solution.  In most Earth surface waters carbonate alkalinity tends to make up most of the total alkalinity due to the common occurrence and dissolution of carbonate rocks and presence of carbon dioxide in the atmosphere. Other common natural components that can contribute to alkalinity include borate, hydroxide, phosphate, silicate, dissolved ammonia, the conjugate bases of some organic acids (e.g., acetate), and sulfate. Solutions produced in a laboratory may contain a virtually limitless number of bases that contribute to alkalinity. Alkalinity is usually given as molar equivalents per liter or kilogram of solution. Commercially, as in the swimming pool industry, alkalinity might also be given in parts per million of equivalent calcium carbonate (ppm CaCO3). Alkalinity is sometimes incorrectly used interchangeably with basicity.   For example, the addition of CO2 lowers the pH of a solution, thus reducing  basicity while alkalinity remains unchanged (see example below). 

A variety of titrants, endpoints, and indicators are specified for various alkalinity measurement methods.  Hydrochloric and sulfuric acids are common acid titrants, while phenolpthalein, methyl red, and bromocresol green are common indicators.

Theoretical treatment
In typical groundwater or seawater, the measured total alkalinity is set equal to:

 AT = []T + 2[]T + []T + [OH−]T + 2[]T + []T + []T − [H+]sws − []

(Subscript T indicates the total concentration of the species in the solution as measured. This is opposed to the free concentration, which takes into account the significant amount of ion pair interactions that occur in seawater.)

Alkalinity can be measured by titrating a sample with a strong acid until all the buffering capacity of the aforementioned ions above the pH of bicarbonate or carbonate is consumed. This point is functionally set to pH 4.5. At this point, all the bases of interest have been protonated to the zero level species, hence they no longer cause alkalinity. In the carbonate system the bicarbonate ions [] and the carbonate ions [] have become converted to carbonic acid [H2CO3] at this pH. This pH is also called the CO2 equivalence point where the major component in water is dissolved CO2 which is converted to H2CO3 in an aqueous solution. There are no strong acids or bases at this point. Therefore, the alkalinity is modeled and quantified with respect to the CO2 equivalence point. Because the alkalinity is measured with respect to the CO2 equivalence point, the dissolution of CO2, although it adds acid and dissolved inorganic carbon, does not change the alkalinity. In natural conditions, the dissolution of basic rocks and addition of ammonia [NH3] or organic amines leads to the addition of base to natural waters at the CO2 equivalence point. The dissolved base in water increases the pH and titrates an equivalent amount of CO2 to bicarbonate ion and carbonate ion. At equilibrium, the water contains a certain amount of alkalinity contributed by the concentration of weak acid anions. Conversely, the addition of acid converts weak acid anions to CO2 and continuous addition of strong acids can cause the alkalinity to become less than zero. For example, the following reactions take place during the addition of acid to a typical seawater solution:

  + H+ → B(OH)3 + H2O

 OH− + H+ → H2O

  + 2 H+ → 

  + H+ → 

 [] + H+ → [Si(OH)4]

They are often represented collectively as [H+]T.

Alkalinity is typically reported as mg/L as CaCO3.  (The conjunction "as" is appropriate in this case because the alkalinity results from a mixture of ions but is reported "as if" all of this is due to CaCO3.)  This can be converted into milliequivalents per Liter (meq/L) by dividing by 50 (the approximate MW of CaCO3 divided by 2).

Example problems

Sum of contributing species
The following equations demonstrate the relative contributions of each component to the alkalinity of a typical seawater sample. Contributions are in μmol.kg−soln−1 and are obtained from A Handbook of Methods for the analysis of carbon dioxide parameters in seawater " ," salinity = 35 g/kg, pH = 8.1, temperature = 25 °C.

 AT = []T + 2[]T + []T + [OH−]T + 2[]T + []T + []T − [H+] − [] − [HF]

Phosphates and silicate, being nutrients, are typically negligible. At pH = 8.1, [] and [HF] are also negligible. So,
{|
|AT || = []T + 2[]T + []T + [OH−]T − [H+]
|-
| || = 1830 + 2 × 270 + 100 + 10 − 0.01
|-
| || = 2480 μmol.kg−soln−1
|}

Addition of CO2
Addition (or removal) of CO2 to a solution does not change its alkalinity, since the net reaction produces the same number of equivalents of positively contributing species (H+) as negative contributing species ( and/or ). Adding CO2 to the solution lowers its pH, but does not affect alkalinity.

At all pH values:

CO2 + H2O ⇌  + H+

Only at high (basic) pH values:

 + H+ ⇌  + 2 H+

Dissolution of carbonate rock
Addition of CO2 to a solution in contact with a solid can (over time) affect the alkalinity, especially for carbonate minerals in contact with groundwater or seawater. The dissolution (or precipitation) of carbonate rock has a strong influence on the alkalinity. This is because carbonate rock is composed of CaCO3 and its dissociation will add Ca2+ and  into solution. Ca2+ will not influence alkalinity, but  will increase alkalinity by 2 units.  Increased dissolution of carbonate rock by acidification from acid rain and mining has contributed to increased alkalinity concentrations in some major rivers throughout the eastern U.S. The following reaction shows how acid rain, containing sulfuric acid, can have the effect of increasing river alkalinity by increasing the amount of bicarbonate ion:

2 CaCO3 + H2SO4 → 2 Ca2+ + 2  + 

Another way of writing this is:

CaCO3 + H+ ⇌ Ca2+ + 

The lower the pH, the higher the concentration of bicarbonate will be. This shows how a lower pH can lead to higher alkalinity if the amount of bicarbonate produced is greater than the amount of H+ remaining after the reaction. This is the case since the amount of acid in the rainwater is low. If this alkaline groundwater later comes into contact with the atmosphere, it can lose CO2, precipitate carbonate, and thereby become less alkaline again. When carbonate minerals, water, and the atmosphere are all in equilibrium, the reversible reaction

CaCO3 + 2 H+ ⇌ Ca2+ + CO2 + H2O

shows that pH will be related to calcium ion concentration, with lower pH going with higher calcium ion concentration. In this case, the higher the pH, the more bicarbonate and carbonate ion there will be, in contrast to the paradoxical situation described above, where one does not have equilibrium with the atmosphere.

Oceanic alkalinity

There are many methods of alkalinity generation in the ocean. The carbonate ion has the potential to absorb two hydrogen ions. Therefore, it causes a net increase in ocean alkalinity. Calcium carbonate dissolution occurs in regions of the ocean which are undersaturated with respect to calcium carbonate; these regions increase in size as a result of a decrease in pH (ocean acidification due to climate change). This can cause great damage to coral reef ecosystems. Lowering of pH due to absorption of CO2 eventually (over millennial timescales) raises mean ocean alkalinity by causing dissolution of carbonates.

Physical processes can also affect alkalinity. Freshwater inputs like melting polar ice caps dilute seawater and can serve to decrease oceanic alkalinity. If the ice were to melt, then the overall volume of the ocean would increase. Because alkalinity is a concentration value (mol/L), increasing the volume would decrease AT. However, the actual effect would be much more complicated than this.

Biological processes have a much greater impact on oceanic alkalinity on short (decades to centuries) timescales. Aerobic respiration of organic matter can decrease alkalinity by releasing protons during the oxidation of organic nitrogen. Denitrification and sulfate reduction occur in oxygen-limited environments. Both of these processes consume hydrogen ions (thus increasing alkalinity) and release gases (N2 or H2S), which eventually escape into the atmosphere. Nitrification and sulfide oxidation both decrease alkalinity by releasing protons as a byproduct of oxidation reactions.

Throughout recent history, there have been many attempts to measure, record, and study oceanic alkalinity, together with many of the other characteristics of seawater, like temperature and salinity. These include: GEOSECS (Geochemical Ocean Sections Study), TTO/NAS (Transient Tracers in the Ocean/North Atlantic Study), JGOFS (Joint Global Ocean Flux Study), WOCE (World Ocean Circulation Experiment), CARINA (Carbon dioxide in the Atlantic Ocean).

Global temporal and spatial variability
The ocean's alkalinity varies over time, most significantly over geologic timescales (millennia). Changes in the balance between terrestrial weathering and sedimentation of carbonate minerals (for example, as a function of ocean acidification) are the primary long-term drivers of alkalinity in the ocean. Over human timescales, mean ocean alkalinity is relatively stable. Seasonal and annual variability of mean ocean alkalinity is very low.

Alkalinity varies by location depending on evaporation/precipitation, advection of water, biological processes, and geochemical processes. Local AT can be affected by two main mixing patterns: current and river. Current dominated mixing occurs close to the shore in areas with strong water flow. In these areas, alkalinity trends follow current and have a segmented relationship with salinity.

River dominated mixing also occurs close to the shore; it is strongest close to the mouth of a large river. Here, the rivers can act as either a source or a sink of alkalinity.  AT follows the outflow of the river and has a linear relationship with salinity. This mixing pattern is most important in late winter and spring, because snowmelt increases the river's outflow. As the season progresses into summer, river processes are less significant, and current mixing can become the dominant process.

Oceanic alkalinity also follows general trends based on latitude and depth. It has been shown that AT is often inversely proportional to sea surface temperature (SST). Therefore, it generally increases with high latitudes and depths. As a result, upwelling areas (where water from the deep ocean is pushed to the surface) also have higher alkalinity values.

Interventions to add alkalinity

See also
 Alkali soils
 Base (chemistry)
 Biological pump
 Dealkalization of water
 Global Ocean Data Analysis Project
 Ocean acidification

References

External links
 Holmes-Farley, Randy. "Chemistry and the Aquarium: What is Alkalinity?," Advanced Aquarist's Online Magazine. Alkalinity as it pertains to salt-water aquariums.
 DOE (1994) ","Handbook of methods for the analysis of the various parameters of the carbon dioxide system in sea water. Version 2, A. G. Dickson & C. Goyet, eds. ORNL/CDIAC-74.
GEOSECS data set 
JGOFS data set 
WOCE data set 
CARINA data set

Carbonate system calculators
The following packages calculate the state of the carbonate system in seawater (including pH):
 CO2SYS , available as a stand-alone executable, Excel spreadsheet, or MATLAB script.
 seacarb, a R package for Windows, Mac OS X and Linux (also available here)
 CSYS, a Matlab script

Chemical oceanography
Acid–base chemistry